Helvella dryophila is a species of fungus in the family Helvellaceae. It is found in western North America, where it associates with oak.

References

External links

dryophila
Fungi described in 2013
Fungi of North America